Kaharudin Nasution Rumbai Stadium is a multi-purpose stadium in Pekanbaru, Riau, Indonesia.  It is currently used mostly for football matches, but also sometimes for athletics.  Now it's the home stadium of PSPS Riau.  The stadium has finished its renovation in 2012, it will host the 2013 AFC U-22 Asian Cup qualification. It has hosted 2012 Indonesia National Games.

Venue and Multi-National Events Host

In 2012, 2013 AFC U-22 Asian Cup qualification, 2012 Pekan Olahraga Nasional (Indonesian National Games) and 2012 Pekan Paralympic Nasional was held in Riau Province. Since then, many sport facilities have been built in Pekanbaru because this city was the home for many sports venues used these multi-national events, such as Rumbai sport center/Kaharudin Nasutiona Sport Center.

References

External links

Stadium information

Sports venues in Indonesia
Football venues in Indonesia
Athletics (track and field) venues in Indonesia
Multi-purpose stadiums in Indonesia
Sports venues in Riau
Football venues in Riau
Athletics (track and field) venues in Riau
Sports venues in Pekanbaru
Football venues in Pekanbaru
Athletics (track and field) venues in Pekanbaru
Pekanbaru
Buildings and structures in Riau
Buildings and structures in Pekanbaru
Sports venues completed in 2012